Wrześnica  (formerly German Freetz) is a village in Gmina Sławno, within Sławno County, West Pomeranian Voivodeship, in north-western Poland.

Before 1648 the area was part of Duchy of Pomerania, 1648-1945 Prussia and Germany. For the history of the region, see History of Pomerania.

The village has an estimated population of 760.

References

Villages in Sławno County